My Fellow Americans is a 1996 American political comedy film directed by Peter Segal. It stars Jack Lemmon and James Garner as feuding ex-presidents, with Dan Aykroyd, Lauren Bacall, Esther Rolle, John Heard, Wilford Brimley, Bradley Whitford and Jeff Yagher in supporting roles. The film is named after the sentence for the traditional opening of presidential addresses to the American people. Walter Matthau was slated to star in the film, but he dropped out and Garner was chosen to star with Lemmon for their first film together.

Plot

Republican senator Russell Kramer of Ohio (Jack Lemmon) wins the presidential election, narrowly defeating archrival Democratic governor Matt Douglas of Indiana (James Garner). Four years later, Douglas wins a landslide victory over the now-incumbent Kramer. Another four years later, Kramer's former Vice President, William Haney (Dan Aykroyd), defeats Douglas. Haney's Vice President, Ted Matthews (John Heard), is widely seen as an idiot, and becomes a continuing embarrassment for the administration. Three more years later, Kramer is spending his time writing books and speaking at various inconsequential functions, while Douglas is finishing his own book and going through a divorce.

Meanwhile, the Democratic Party learns about "Olympia", the codename for a series of bribes from defense contractor Charlie Reynolds (James Rebhorn) paid to Haney when he was Vice President. The Democratic National Committee chairman, Joe Hollis (Wilford Brimley), asks Douglas to investigate. Hollis offers the support of the Democratic Party for a presidential run in return for his help. Douglas accepts, hoping to beat Haney and get back into the Oval Office. Meanwhile, Haney and his Chief of Staff Carl Witnaur (Bradley Whitford) plot to frame Kramer for the scandal, despite Haney's private acknowledgment to Witnaur that Kramer had known nothing about it. When rumors begin to suggest that Kramer was involved in Olympia, he begins his own investigation.

NSA agent Colonel Paul Tanner (Everett McGill) has Reynolds assassinated when he attempts to tell Douglas the truth about Olympia. Kramer arrives at the scene to find Douglas with Reynolds' body. Before they can flee, Douglas and Kramer are forced to board Marine One by Tanner, who claims that they will be taken to Camp David for their security at the request of Haney. During the flight, Douglas realizes that they are heading in the wrong direction. Suspicious, they force the pilots to land. They disembark just before the helicopter explodes.

Kramer and Douglas are left stranded, with the realization that the explosion was meant to kill them. They decide to go to Kramer's Presidential Library in Cuyahoga Falls, Ohio, to obtain records the overly frugal Kramer kept of all meals served during his time in the White House, which will prove that Haney was present at a key meeting with Reynolds. During a series of misadventures, they meet a variety of ordinary Americans and see the effects their terms in office have had. After several close encounters with NSA agents, they arrive at the library and discover that the evidence has been tampered with to implicate Kramer. A guard gives Kramer a message from Reynolds' secretary stating that Witnaur had recently met with Reynolds. Douglas and Kramer kidnap Witnaur and with Joe Hollis's help, force him to reveal the plot to frame Kramer, though Witnaur claims to have no knowledge of the attempts on their lives, blaming Tanner. They at first decide to report Witnaur's confession to Kay Griffin (Sela Ward), a journalist, but Douglas, reflecting upon their adventure, convinces Kramer to go directly to the White House to confront Haney personally, seeing it as a chance of redemption for their poor choices as Presidents.

They manage to sneak into the White House with the help of the White House Executive Chef Rita (Esther Rolle) and make it to the Executive Residence only to discover that Haney is giving a press conference outside. Tanner traps Douglas and Kramer in a guest room but they utilize a secret tunnel to escape while the NSA gives chase. Tanner catches up with them and is about to shoot them when he himself is killed by Secret Service Sniper Lieutenant Ralph Fleming (Jeff Yagher), who has recognized the presidents from a chance encounter at a gay pride parade during their adventure.

Douglas and Kramer interrupt Haney's speech and take him to the Oval Office to talk. There they play Haney a tape of Witnaur's confession, but Haney denies knowledge of Reynolds' murder or the helicopter explosion. Haney agrees to resign and proceeds to give a resignation speech, claiming to have heart problems. Douglas and Kramer muse that the idiotic Matthews will now be elevated from Vice President to President and realize that the only way it could have happened was under these circumstances.  The pair confront Matthews, who admits his stupidity is just an act and that he, not Haney, had engineered the entire plot so that he could become President, knowing Haney would take the fall. Douglas secretly records his confession on tape, and Matthews is sent to prison.

Nine months later, Douglas and Kramer are running together as independents in the Presidential election, arguing which of them will be the nominee for President. Douglas distracts Kramer by throwing a dollar on the floor, and grabs the microphone to announce himself as the Presidential candidate, much to Kramer's chagrin.

Cast

Filming
Most of the principal filming for the film was done in the mountains of western North Carolina. Scenes were filmed along the Broad River where it flows into Lake Lure in Rutherford County, Dillsboro, along the Great Smoky Mountains Railroad; Waynesville, where a giant clown sign crashes through their windshield as they try to flee and where they find the baby in the stolen car is in Marshall, North Carolina; and in Asheville, at the Biltmore Estate.

In Asheville, North Carolina, the downtown area stands in for an unnamed town in West Virginia. There, the Western Carolina University Marching Band portrays the "All Dorothy Marching Band" (a fictional group based on Dorothy Gale in The Wizard of Oz), at a gay pride parade.

In his memoirs, Garner wrote that he enjoyed working with Lemmon but felt the director "was a self appointed genius who didn't know his ass from second base and Jack and I both knew it."

Reception
My Fellow Americans received mixed reviews from critics. It holds a 47% rating on Rotten Tomatoes based on 60 reviews and with an average rating of 5.3/10 and the critical consensus: "It doesn't commit any impeachable offenses, but My Fellow Americans lacks strong regulatory oversight of its toothless political satire and misuse of comedic talent."

Roger Ebert of the Chicago Sun-Times praised Lemmon and Garner, but felt the film was "a series of cheap shots and missed opportunities". However, he said that "a lot of the cheap shots are funny, and maybe the climate is wrong for sharply barbed political satire. I dunno. This is not a great comedy and will be soon forgotten, but it has nice moments." James Berardinelli of ReelViews also complimented the actors, writing "Lemmon and Garner slip comfortably into their roles" and saying the movie has "some good one-liners", but he criticized the "failed attempts to inject embarrassingly trite melodrama and recycled action sequences into the story" and also felt the political satire was "weak and obligatory". Mick LaSalle of the San Francisco Chronicle described My Fellow Americans as a "pleasing but mediocre film, with a great cast, a great story and a misguided script."

References

External links
 
 
 
 
 
 James Garner Interview on The Charlie Rose Show
 James Garner interview at Archive of American Television

1990s buddy comedy films
1990s comedy road movies
1996 films
American buddy comedy films
American political comedy films
American comedy road movies
Films about elections
Films about fictional presidents of the United States
Films directed by Peter Segal
Films scored by William Ross
Films set in the White House
Films set in Washington, D.C.
Films shot in California
Films shot in North Carolina
Films shot in Washington, D.C.
Films with screenplays by Peter Tolan
United States presidential succession in fiction
Warner Bros. films
Films produced by Jon Peters
1996 comedy films
1990s English-language films
1990s American films